Dobrovlje pri Mozirju is a dispersed settlement in the Municipality of Mozirje in northern Slovenia. It lies in the hills above the right bank of the Savinja River south of Mozirje. The area is part of the traditional region of Styria. The municipality is now included in the Savinja Statistical Region.

Name
The name of the settlement was changed from Dobrovlje to Dobrovlje pri Mozirju in 1955.

References

External links
Dobrovlje pri Mozirju on Geopedia

Populated places in the Municipality of Mozirje